Hunter Harkins Barco (born December 15, 2000) is an American professional baseball pitcher in the Pittsburgh Pirates organization.

Amateur career
Barco attended The Bolles School in Jacksonville, Florida, where he began playing varsity baseball in the eighth grade.  He committed to play college baseball at the University of Virginia when he was 14, but later switched his commitment to the University of Florida. He posted a 12-0 record and 0.53 ERA as a freshman and was named The Florida Times-Union Player of the Year. Barco then pitched to a 1.84 ERA as a sophomore, a 1.98 ERA as a junior, and a 5-0 record with a 1.84 ERA as a senior in 2019. During the summer of 2018, he played in the Under Armour All-America Baseball Game at Wrigley Field. He ended his high school career with a 35-4 record, a 1.53 ERA and 336 strikeouts alongside a .299 batting average and 13 home runs. He was considered a top prospect for the 2019 Major League Baseball draft, but was not selected until the 24th round by the New York Mets and did not sign due to his strong college commitment.

In 2020, Barco's freshman year, he pitched   innings in which he went 2-0 with a 1.40 ERA and 26 strikeouts before the remainder of the season was cancelled due to the COVID-19 pandemic. He spent that summer playing in the Texas Collegiate League for the Tulsa Drillers. In 2021, Barco started 16 games for the Gators and went 10-3 with a 4.01 ERA, 94 strikeouts, and 26 walks across 83 innings. Following the season's end, he was selected to play for the USA Baseball Collegiate National Team. Barco was named Florida's Opening Day starter for the 2022 season, striking out 11 batters over six innings in a 19-1 win over the South Alabama Jaguars. He was subsequently named the SEC Pitcher of the Week. In mid-April, Barco was shut down indefinitely with elbow discomfort. A few weeks later, it was announced that he would be undergoing Tommy John surgery and would miss the remainder of the season. Over nine starts for the season, Barco went 5-2 with a 2.50 ERA, 69 strikeouts, and 11 walks over  innings.

Professional career
Barco was selected by the Pittsburgh Pirates with the 44th overall selection in the 2022 Major League Baseball draft. He signed with the team for $1.5 million.

Personal life
Barco's father, Barry, was a placekicker for the Florida State Seminoles football team from 1983 through 1985.

References

External links
Florida Gators bio
Hunter Barco Official Website

2000 births
Living people
Baseball players from Jacksonville, Florida
Sportspeople from Jacksonville, Florida
Baseball pitchers
Florida Gators baseball players
United States national baseball team players